Elgin   is a community in the Canadian province of Nova Scotia, in  Pictou County.  It is named after James Bruce, 8th Earl of Elgin.

References

Elgin on Destination Nova Scotia

Communities in Pictou County
General Service Areas in Nova Scotia